Tepsi baytinijan (literally: eggplant platter) is a popular Iraqi casserole dish consisting of eggplants, which are sliced and fried before placing in a baking dish, accompanied with meatballs, tomatoes, onions and garlic. Potato slices are placed on top of the mixture, and the dish is baked.

Like many other Iraqi dishes, it is usually served with rice, along with salad and pickles.

See also
Patlıcanlı kebab

References

Arab cuisine
Iraqi cuisine
Assyrian cuisine
Kurdish cuisine
Levantine cuisine
Casserole dishes
Eggplant dishes
Middle Eastern grilled meats